Just Folk is a 1965 Australian television aired on Sydney station ATN-7 (it is not clear if it was shown on any other stations across Australia). It was a weekly half-hour series featuring folk music. Gary Shearston was the host. Despite the wiping of the era, an episode of this series is held by the National Film and Sound Archive.

References

External links
Just Folk on IMDb

Black-and-white Australian television shows
English-language television shows
1965 Australian television series debuts
1965 Australian television series endings
Australian music television series